Surenabad (also Romanized as Sūrenābād, Sowrnābād, and Sūranābād; also known as Sornābād) is a village in Gavrud Rural District, in the Central District of Sonqor County, Kermanshah Province, Iran. At the 2006 census, its population was 321, in 79 families.

References 

Populated places in Sonqor County